The 2021 NCAA Division I FBS football season was the 152nd season of college football in the United States organized by the National Collegiate Athletic Association (NCAA) at its highest level of competition, the Football Bowl Subdivision. The regular season began on August 28, 2021, and ended on December 11, 2021. The postseason began on December 17, with the main games ending on January 10, 2022, with the College Football Playoff National Championship at Lucas Oil Stadium in Indianapolis, and the all-star portion of the post-season concluding with the inaugural HBCU Legacy Bowl on February 19, 2022. It was the eighth season of the College Football Playoff (CFP) system.  It was the first time since 2016 that no major team finished the season undefeated as the Cincinnati Bearcats, the season's last undefeated team, were defeated in the 2021 Cotton Bowl Classic.

Rule changes
The following rule changes, recommended by the NCAA Football Rules Committee for the 2021 season on March 12 of that year, were approved by the NCAA Playing Rules Oversight Panel on April 22.
 In overtime, teams scoring a touchdown will be required to attempt a two-point conversion starting with the second overtime period (previously the third overtime period). If the scores are still tied at the expiration of the second overtime, teams will be required to attempt alternating two point conversions starting with the third overtime (previously the fifth overtime period). Teams can still choose to go for the PAT kick or two-point conversion during the first overtime period.  The first game using this procedure was on September 18 between Utah and San Diego State,  won by SDSU 33–31 in three overtimes. On October 23, the all-time FBS record for most overtimes in a single game was broken when Illinois defeated host Penn State 20–18 in nine overtimes.
 Permanently extending the team area from between the 25-yard lines to between the 20-yard lines. A rule implemented for the 2020 season due to the COVID-19 pandemic had extended this area to between the 15-yard lines, but it had been scheduled to revert to the 25 for 2021.
 Provide a framework to allow a school or conference to request a postgame video review about questionable actions (i.e. feigning injuries to stop the clock and slow down teams' momentum) through the NCAA secretary-rules editor/national coordinator of officials.
 Explicitly prohibiting video board and lighting system operators from creating "any distraction that obstructs play", with violations being deemed unsportsmanlike conduct.
 If replay overturns a call on the field, the game clock will only be adjusted inside of the last 2:00 of the first half and the last 5:00 of the second half.
Another rule change was made during the season:
 After Pitt quarterback Kenny Pickett's fake slide in the 2021 ACC Championship Game against Wake Forest, the NCAA Football Rules Committee changed the interpretation of the "QB Slide Rule" to require officials to interpret a fake slide as "giving himself up" and blow the play dead.

"Points of Emphasis" for the 2021 season included:
 Any taunting action toward an opponent will be penalized.
 Automatic unsportsmanlike conduct penalties will be imposed on a coach who leaves the team area or goes onto the field of play to argue with the officials.
 Officials are to be more alert to players significantly in violation of uniform rules (specifically pants, jerseys, and T-shirts that extend below the torso), and to send violators out of the game to correct the issue.

Other headlines
 On April 15, 2021, the NCAA Division I Council adopted legislation that extended the so-called "one-time transfer exception" to all D-I sports, with the Division I Board of Directors ratifying this on April 28. This allows student-athletes in baseball, men's and women's basketball, football, and men's ice hockey to transfer one time without having to sit out a year, placing them under the same transfer regulations that previously applied to all other D-I sports.
 On June 10, the College Football Playoff announced that it had begun work on a proposal to expand the playoff to 12 teams in the indefinite future. Under the proposed format:
 The six conference champions ranked highest by the CFP selection committee would receive automatic berths. The field would be filled out by the committee's six highest-ranked remaining teams, with no restrictions on conference affiliation.
 The four highest-ranked conference champions would receive first-round byes.
 The remaining 8 teams would play first-round games hosted by the higher seeds.
 The quarterfinals and semifinals would be hosted by existing bowl games, with the final continuing to be held at a separately determined neutral site.
 On June 21, the Supreme Court of the United States ruled in National Collegiate Athletic Association v. Alston that the NCAA had no authority to limit education-related non-cash compensation for athletes, but stopped short of addressing direct cash payments to college athletes.
 On July 21, the Houston Chronicle reported that Oklahoma and Texas had approached the Southeastern Conference about the possibility of joining that league, and that an announcement could come in early August. The SEC and both schools refused comment on this report, but did not issue definitive denials.
 On July 26, Oklahoma and Texas notified the Big 12 Conference that the two schools do not wish to extend its grant of television rights beyond the 2024–25 athletic year and intend to leave the conference.
 On July 27, Oklahoma and Texas reached out to the SEC about acceptance into the conference in 2025.
 July 28 – The Big 12 sent a cease-and-desist letter to ESPN, accusing the network of tortious interference by working with other conferences attempting to lure Big 12 members in a bid to ease Oklahoma's and Texas' exits for the SEC. The network denied the allegations.
 July 29 – The presidents and chancellors of the 14 current SEC members voted unanimously to extend invitations to Oklahoma and Texas, effective in 2025.
 July 30 – The boards of regents of both Oklahoma and Texas unanimously accepted the SEC's invitations.
 August 16 – The Associated Press released its preseason rankings, with Alabama as the overwhelming choice for #1. Other ranking highlights:
 Iowa State received its highest AP ranking in school history at #7. 
 Coastal Carolina and Louisiana, respectively #22 and #23, became the first Sun Belt Conference teams to be ranked in the preseason.
 August 24 – The Pac-12 Conference, Big Ten Conference, and Atlantic Coast Conference announced an alliance designed to "stabilize the current environment" by collaborating on a number of issues, including scheduling for football, men's and women's basketball.
 September 3 – Multiple media outlets reported that the Big 12 was on the verge of inviting four schools—American Athletic Conference members Cincinnati, Houston, and UCF, plus BYU, an FBS independent and otherwise a member of the non-football West Coast Conference. All four schools were reportedly preparing membership applications, and reports were that their future entrance could be approved as early as the next scheduled meeting of Big 12 presidents on September 10. The entry timeline was uncertain at the time of the report, but 2024 was seen as the likeliest date.
 September 10 – BYU, Cincinnati, Houston, and UCF were officially announced as incoming Big 12 members no later than 2024–25.
 October 18 – Yahoo Sports reported that The American, which had been rocked by the impending departure of three of its most prominent schools, was preparing to receive applications from six of the 14 members of Conference USA—Charlotte, Florida Atlantic, North Texas, Rice, UAB, and UTSA. Should all six schools join, The American would become a 14-team conference in all sports. (Navy is a football-only member, while Wichita State is a full member but does not sponsor football.)
 October 19 – ESPN reported that all six C-USA members named in Yahoo Sports' report had submitted applications to The American, and that each would receive a formal letter by the end of that week (October 22) detailing the terms of expansion.
 October 21 – The six aforementioned C-USA members were announced as incoming members of The American at a date to be determined.
 October 22 – The Action Network reported that C-USA member Southern Miss had accepted an invitation to join the Sun Belt Conference in 2023, though no formal announcement had then been made. The report added that the Sun Belt was preparing to add two other C-USA members, Marshall and Old Dominion, as well as FCS program James Madison. At the time, formal announcements of new members were expected on October 25, but an announcement regarding Marshall was likely to wait until after the school announced its new president on October 28.
 October 26 – Southern Miss was officially announced as a Sun Belt member, effective no later than July 2023. In other Sun Belt realignment news, it was reported that Old Dominion's arrival would be announced later that week, and that James Madison's board had scheduled an emergency meeting on October 29 (presumably to discuss a Sun Belt invitation).
 October 27 – Old Dominion was officially announced as a Sun Belt member, also effective no later than July 2023. This marked ODU's return to that conference after an absence of more than 30 years.
 October 30 – The day after both the Sun Belt Conference and Marshall issued tweets indicating that the Thundering Herd had accepted a Sun Belt invitation, this move was officially announced.
 November 5 – Multiple media outlets reported that Conference USA, which had nine of their schools depart to other separate conferences, handed out invitations to four schools: FBS independents Liberty and New Mexico State as well as FCS programs Jacksonville State and Sam Houston State, which were all accepted.
 November 6 – James Madison made their move to the Sun Belt official, effective no later than July 2023.
 November 23 – Cincinnati became the first Group of Five team ever to receive a top-four College Football Playoff ranking, coming in at fourth in this week's rankings.
 December 5 – The College Football Playoff field was revealed, featuring (in order of seeding) Alabama, Michigan, Georgia, and Cincinnati. This marked the first time a Group of Five team received a CFP berth.
 December 17 – After Coastal Carolina's 47–41 win over Northern Illinois in the Cure Bowl, Coastal quarterback Grayson McCall finished the season with a 207.6 passer rating, breaking the FBS record of 203.1 set last season by Alabama's Mac Jones.
 December 18 – During Western Kentucky's 59–38 win over Appalachian State in the Boca Raton Bowl, WKU quarterback Bailey Zappe broke two major single-season FBS passing records and equaled a single-season FBS total offense record:
 5,967 passing yards (surpassing the 5,833 yards of Texas Tech's B. J. Symons in 2003)
 62 passing touchdowns (surpassing the 60 TDs of LSU's Joe Burrow in 2019)
 65 touchdowns responsible for (combined passing and rushing; equals Burrow's 2019 mark)
 December 22 – After San Diego State's 38–24 win over UTSA in the Frisco Bowl, SDSU punter and placekicker Matt Araiza ended the season with a 51.19-yard punting average, breaking the FBS single-season record of 50.98 yards set by Braden Mann of Texas A&M in 2018.
 January 1 - Ohio State receiver Jaxon Smith-Njigba set an all-time FBS bowl game record with 347 receiving yards on 15 catches in the Rose Bowl game against Utah.  He also broke the Ohio State team record for receiving yards in a game and in a single season.

Conference realignment and new programs

Membership changes

 James Madison will leave the Colonial Athletic Association and join the Sun Belt Conference in 2022.
 Marshall will leave the Conference USA and join the Sun Belt in 2022.
 Old Dominion will leave the Conference USA and join the Sun Belt in 2022.
 Southern Miss will leave the Conference USA and join the Sun Belt in 2022.

Stadiums
This was the first season for UAB at Protective Stadium, replacing its old stadium, Legion Field. The first game was a 36–12 UAB loss to Liberty on October 2.
 With the closure of Aloha Stadium to future events and plans to build a new stadium on the site, Hawaii is playing through at least the 2023 season at the on-campus Clarence T. C. Ching Athletics Complex, home to the university's track and field program. A project expanded the stadium to at least 10,000 in time for the 2021 season, and was completed in just over four months. However, due to city and state COVID-19 public health orders restricting gatherings, and taking into consideration the isolated nature of the state from the mainland in receiving aid to deal with the pandemic, all games were to be played behind closed doors until further notice. It is the only team in Division I FBS that is restricting attendance. On October 8, 2021, Mayor of Honolulu Rick Blangiardi gave permission for the stadium to host 1,000 spectators. All spectators must wear masks and be fully-vaccinated (if capable of being so). In November 2021, capacity limitations were lifted, but all other restrictions remained in force.
 This was the last of two seasons that San Diego State spent at its temporary home of Dignity Health Sports Park in Carson, California. SDSU will move to the new Snapdragon Stadium, nearing completion on part of the property formerly occupied by the team's since-demolished San Diego Stadium, next season.

Kickoff games
Rankings reflect the AP Poll entering each week.

"Week Zero"
The regular season began on Saturday, August 28 with five games in Week 0.
Nebraska 22 at Illinois 30
UConn 0 at Fresno State 45
Hawaii 10 at UCLA 44
UTEP 30 at New Mexico State 3
Southern Utah 14 at San Jose State 45

Week 1
The majority of FBS teams opened the season on Labor Day weekend. Eight neutral-site "kickoff" games were held.

 Wednesday, September 1
Montgomery Kickoff (Cramton Bowl, Montgomery, Alabama): Jacksonville State 0 vs. UAB 31
 Thursday, September 2
Duke's Mayo Classic (Bank of America Stadium, Charlotte): Appalachian State 33 vs. East Carolina 19
 Saturday, September 4
Chick-fil-A Kickoff Game (Mercedes-Benz Stadium, Atlanta):  No. 1 Alabama 44  vs. No. 14 Miami (FL) 13
Duke's Mayo Classic (Bank of America Stadium, Charlotte): No. 3 Clemson 3 vs.  No. 5 Georgia 10 
Allstate Kickoff Classic (AT&T Stadium, Arlington, Texas): Kansas State 24  vs. Stanford 7
Texas Kickoff (NRG Stadium, Houston): Houston 21 vs. Texas Tech 38 
Vegas Kickoff Classic (Allegiant Stadium, Paradise, Nevada): Arizona 16 vs. BYU 24 
Monday, September 6
Chick-fil-A Kickoff Game (Mercedes-Benz Stadium, Atlanta): Louisville 24 vs. Ole Miss 43

Regular season top 10 matchups
Rankings reflect the AP Poll. Rankings for Week 10 and beyond will list College Football Playoff Rankings first and AP Poll second. Teams that failed to be a top 10 team for one poll or the other will be noted.
Week 1
No. 5 Georgia defeated No. 3 Clemson, 10–3 (Bank of America Stadium, Charlotte, North Carolina)
Week 2
No. 10 Iowa defeated No. 9 Iowa State, 27–17 (Jack Trice Stadium, Ames, Iowa)
Week 5
 No. 2 Georgia defeated No. 8 Arkansas, 37–0 (Sanford Stadium, Athens, Georgia)
 No. 7 Cincinnati defeated No. 9 Notre Dame, 24–13 (Notre Dame Stadium, South Bend, Indiana)
Week 6
No. 3 Iowa defeated No. 4 Penn State, 23–20 (Kinnick Stadium, Iowa City, Iowa)
Week 9
No. 8 Michigan State defeated No. 6 Michigan, 37–33 (Spartan Stadium, East Lansing, Michigan)
Week 12
No. 4/5 Ohio State defeated No. 7/7 Michigan State, 56–7 (Ohio Stadium, Columbus, Ohio)
Week 13
No. 5/6 Michigan defeated No. 2/2 Ohio State, 42–27 (Michigan Stadium, Ann Arbor, Michigan)
No. 7/7 Oklahoma State defeated No. 10/10 Oklahoma, 37–33 (Boone Pickens Stadium, Stillwater, Oklahoma)
Week 14
 No. 3/4 Alabama defeated No 1/1 Georgia 41–24 (2021 SEC Championship Game, Mercedes-Benz Stadium, Atlanta, Georgia)
 No. 9/9 Baylor defeated No. 5/5 Oklahoma State, 21–16 (2021 Big 12 Championship Game, AT&T Stadium, Arlington, Texas)

FCS team wins over FBS teams

Upsets
This section lists instances of unranked teams defeating AP Poll-ranked teams during the season.

Regular season
During the regular season, 48 unranked FBS teams, plus 1 FCS team, defeated ranked FBS teams.   

September 3, 2021
Virginia Tech 17, No. 10 North Carolina 10
September 4, 2021:
 UCLA 38, No. 16 LSU 27
(No. 9 FCS) Montana 13, No. 20 Washington 7
September 11, 2021:
 Stanford 42, No. 14 USC 28
 Arkansas 40, No. 15 Texas 21
 BYU 26, No. 21 Utah 17
 September 18, 2021:
 Fresno State 40, No. 13 UCLA 37
 West Virginia 27, No. 15 Virginia Tech 21
 Michigan State 38, No. 24 Miami (FL) 17
 September 25, 2021:
 NC State 27, No. 9 Clemson 21 2OT
 Baylor 31, No. 14 Iowa State 29
 Georgia Tech 45, No. 21 North Carolina 22
 Oklahoma State 31, No. 25 Kansas State 20
 October 2, 2021
 Stanford 31, No. 3 Oregon 24 OT
 Kentucky 20, No. 10 Florida 13
 Mississippi State 26, No. 15 Texas A&M 22
 Hawaii 27, No. 18 Fresno State 24
 Arizona State 42, No. 20 UCLA 23
 October 9, 2021:
 Texas A&M 41, No. 1 Alabama 38
 Boise State 26, No. 10 BYU 17
 October 16, 2021:
 Purdue 24, No. 2 Iowa 7
 Auburn 38, No. 17 Arkansas 23
 Utah 35, No. 18 Arizona State 21
 Baylor 38, No. 19 BYU 24
 LSU 49, No. 20 Florida 42
 October 20, 2021
 Appalachian State 30, No. 14 Coastal Carolina 27
 October 23, 2021
 Illinois 20, No. 7 Penn State 18 9OT
 Iowa State 24, No. 8 Oklahoma State 21
 Miami (FL) 31, No. 18 NC State 30
 Wisconsin 30, No. 25 Purdue 13
 October 30, 2021
 Wisconsin 27, No. 9 Iowa 7
 Mississippi State 31, No. 12 Kentucky 17
 Miami (FL) 38, No. 17 Pittsburgh 34
 Houston 44, No. 19 SMU 37
 Fresno State 30, No. 21 San Diego State 20
 West Virginia 38, No. 22 Iowa State 31
 November 6, 2021
 Purdue 40, No. 5 Michigan State 29
 North Carolina 58, No. 10 Wake Forest 55
 TCU 30, No. 14 Baylor 28
 Tennessee 45, No. 18 Kentucky 42
 Memphis 28, No. 23 SMU 25
 Boise State 40, No. 25 Fresno State 14
 November 13, 2021
 Mississippi State 43, No. 16 Auburn 34
 Georgia State 42, No. 22 Coastal Carolina 40
 November 20, 2021
 Clemson 48, No. 13 Wake Forest 27
 November 27, 2021
 North Texas 45, No. 15 UTSA 27
 Minnesota 23, No. 18 Wisconsin 13
 LSU 27, No. 14 Texas A&M 24
 December 4, 2021
 Utah State 46, No. 19 San Diego State 13

Bowl games

Rankings in this section are based on the final CFP rankings released on December 5, 2021.

December 18, 2021
UAB 31, No. 13 BYU 28 (Independence Bowl)

Conference standings

Rankings

The top 25 from the AP and USA Today Coaches Polls.

Pre-season polls

CFB Playoff final rankings
On December 5, 2021, the College Football Playoff selection committee announced its final team rankings for the year.

Final rankings

Conference summaries
Rankings in this section are based on CFP rankings released prior to the games.

Conference champions' bowl games
Ranks are per the final CFP rankings, released on December 5, with win–loss records at that time.

CFP College Football Playoff participant

Postseason

There are 42 team-competitive FBS post-season bowl games, with two teams advancing to a 43rd – the CFP National Championship game. Normally, a team is required to have a .500 minimum winning percentage during the regular season to become bowl-eligible (six wins for an 11- or 12-game schedule, and seven wins for a 13-game schedule). If there are not enough winning teams to fulfill all open bowl slots, teams with losing records may be chosen to fill all 84 bowl slots. Additionally, on the rare occasion in which a conference champion does not meet eligibility requirements, they are usually still chosen for bowl games via tie-ins for their conference.

Bowl-eligible teams 
ACC (10): Boston College, Clemson, Louisville, Miami (FL), NC State, North Carolina, Pittsburgh, Virginia, Virginia Tech, Wake Forest
American (7): Cincinnati, East Carolina, Houston, Memphis, SMU, Tulsa, UCF 
Big Ten (9): Iowa, Maryland, Michigan, Michigan State, Minnesota, Ohio State, Penn State, Purdue, Wisconsin
Big 12 (7): Baylor, Iowa State, Kansas State, Oklahoma, Oklahoma State, Texas Tech, West Virginia
C-USA (8): Marshall, Middle Tennessee, North Texas, Old Dominion, UAB, UTEP, UTSA, Western Kentucky 
MAC (8): Ball State, Central Michigan, Eastern Michigan, Kent State, Miami (OH), Northern Illinois, Toledo, Western Michigan
Mountain West (8): Air Force, Boise State, Fresno State, Hawaii, Nevada, San Diego State, Utah State, Wyoming
Pac-12 (6): Arizona State, Oregon, Oregon State, UCLA, Utah, Washington State
SEC (13): Alabama, Arkansas, Auburn, Florida, Georgia, Kentucky, LSU, Mississippi State, Missouri, Ole Miss, South Carolina, Tennessee, Texas A&M
Sun Belt (4): Appalachian State, Coastal Carolina, Georgia State, Louisiana
Independent (4): Army, BYU, Liberty, Notre Dame
Number of bowl berths available: 84Number of bowl-eligible teams: 84

Bowl-eligible team that did not receive a berth 
On December 2, NCAA announced the 42nd bowl game, thus guaranteeing all teams with six wins (83 bowl-eligible teams plus Hawaii with a 6–7 record) could play in a bowl game. The added bowl game, later named the 2021 Frisco Football Classic, essentially served as a replacement of the canceled San Francisco Bowl.

Bowl-ineligible teams 
ACC (4): Duke, Florida State, Georgia Tech, Syracuse
American (4): Navy, South Florida, Temple, Tulane
Big Ten (5):  Illinois, Indiana, Nebraska, Northwestern, Rutgers
Big 12 (3): Kansas, TCU, Texas
C-USA (6): Charlotte, Florida Atlantic, FIU, Louisiana Tech, Rice, Southern Miss
MAC (4): Akron, Buffalo, Bowling Green, Ohio
Mountain West (4): Colorado State,  New Mexico, San Jose State, UNLV
Pac-12 (6):  Arizona, California, Colorado, Stanford, USC, Washington
SEC (1): Vanderbilt
Sun Belt (6): Arkansas State, Georgia Southern, Louisiana–Monroe, South Alabama, Texas State, Troy
Independent (3): New Mexico State, UConn, UMass

Number of bowl-ineligible teams: 46 
 Rutgers had the highest Academic Progress Rate (APR) of five-win teams. The NCAA announced on December 23 that Rutgers was the first eligible team, under APR regulations, to replace Texas A&M in the Gator Bowl. Rutgers accepted the bid.

College Football Playoff

Conference performance in bowl games

Count of bowl games

All-star games

Awards and honors

Heisman Trophy
The Heisman Trophy is given to the year's most outstanding player.

 1. Bryce Young, QB, Alabama (684 1st place votes, 107 2nd place votes, 45 3rd place votes, 2311 total votes)
 2. Aidan Hutchinson, DE, Michigan (78 1st place votes, 273 2nd place votes, 174 3rd place votes, 954 total votes)
 3. Kenny Pickett, QB, Pittsburgh (28 1st place votes, 175 2nd place votes, 197 3rd place votes, 631 total votes)
 4. C. J. Stroud, QB, Ohio State (12 1st place votes, 118 2nd place votes, 127 3rd place votes, 399 total votes)
 5. Will Anderson Jr., LB, Alabama (31 1st place votes, 79 2nd place votes, 74 3rd place votes, 325 total votes)
 6. Kenneth Walker III, RB, Michigan State (18 1st place votes, 53 2nd place votes, 85 3rd place votes, 245 total votes)
 7. Matt Corral, QB, Ole Miss (10 1st place votes, 32 2nd place votes, 56 3rd place votes, 150 total votes)
 8. Desmond Ridder, QB, Cincinnati (5 1st place votes, 15 2nd place votes, 36 3rd place votes, 81 total votes)
 9. Jordan Davis, DT, Georgia (9 1st place votes, 15 2nd place votes, 18 3rd place votes, 75 total votes)
 10. Breece Hall, RB, Iowa State (0 1st place votes, 5 2nd place votes, 7 3rd place votes, 17 total votes)

Other overall
 AP Player of the Year: Bryce Young, QB, Alabama
 Lombardi Award (top player): Aidan Hutchinson, DE, Michigan
 Maxwell Award (top player): Bryce Young, QB, Alabama
 SN Player of the Year: Bryce Young, QB, Alabama
 Walter Camp Award (top player): Kenneth Walker III, RB, Michigan State

Special overall
 Burlsworth Trophy (top player who began as walk-on): Grant Morgan, LB, Arkansas
 Paul Hornung Award (most versatile player): Marcus Jones, CB, Houston
 Jon Cornish Trophy (top Canadian player): John Metchie III, WR, Alabama
 Campbell Trophy ("academic Heisman"): Charlie Kolar, Iowa State
 Academic All-American of the Year: Charlie Kolar, Iowa State
 Wuerffel Trophy (humanitarian-athlete): Isaiah Sanders, QB, Stanford
 Senior CLASS Award (senior student-athlete): Kenny Pickett, QB, Pittsburgh

Offense
Quarterback

 Davey O'Brien Award: Bryce Young, Alabama
 Johnny Unitas Golden Arm Award (senior/4th year quarterback): Kenny Pickett, Pittsburgh
 Manning Award: Bryce Young, Alabama

Running back

 Doak Walker Award: Kenneth Walker III, Michigan State

Wide receiver

 Fred Biletnikoff Award: Jordan Addison, Pittsburgh

Tight end

 John Mackey Award: Trey McBride, Colorado State

Lineman:

 Rimington Trophy (center): Tyler Linderbaum, Iowa
 Outland Trophy (interior lineman on either offense or defense): Jordan Davis, DT, Georgia
 Joe Moore Award (offensive line): Michigan

Defense
 Bronko Nagurski Trophy (defensive player): Will Anderson Jr., LB, Alabama
 Chuck Bednarik Award (defensive player): Jordan Davis, DT, Georgia
 Lott Trophy (defensive impact): Aidan Hutchinson, DE, Michigan 

Defensive front

 Dick Butkus Award (linebacker): Nakobe Dean, Georgia
 Ted Hendricks Award (defensive end): Aidan Hutchinson, Michigan

Defensive back

 Jim Thorpe Award: Coby Bryant, Cincinnati

Special teams
 Lou Groza Award (placekicker): Jake Moody, Michigan
 Ray Guy Award (punter): Matt Araiza, San Diego State
 Jet Award (return specialist): Marcus Jones, Houston
 Patrick Mannelly Award (long snapper): Cal Adomitis, Pittsburgh 
 Peter Mortell Holder of the Year Award: Reid Bauer, Arkansas

Coaches
 AFCA Coach of the Year Award: Luke Fickell, Cincinnati
 AP Coach of the Year: Jim Harbaugh, Michigan
 Bobby Dodd Coach of the Year: Luke Fickell, Cincinnati
 Eddie Robinson Coach of the Year: Luke Fickell, Cincinnati
 George Munger Award: Dave Aranda, Baylor
 Home Depot Coach of the Year: Luke Fickell, Cincinnati 
 Paul "Bear" Bryant Award: Luke Fickell, Cincinnati
 Walter Camp Coach of the Year: Luke Fickell, Cincinnati

Assistants
 AFCA Assistant Coach of the Year: Newland Isaac, Coastal Carolina
 Broyles Award: Josh Gattis, Michigan

All-Americans

Coaching changes

Preseason and in-season
This is restricted to coaching changes taking place on or after May 1, 2021, and will include any changes announced after a team's last regularly scheduled game but before its bowl game. For coaching changes that occurred earlier in 2021, see 2020 NCAA Division I FBS end-of-season coaching changes.

End of season
This list includes coaching changes announced during the season that did not take effect until the end of the season.

Television viewers and ratings

Most watched regular season games

Conference championship games

Most watched non-CFP bowl games

New Year Six and College Football Playoff semifinal games

See also
 2021 NCAA Division I FCS football season
 2021 NCAA Division II football season
 2021 NCAA Division III football season
 2021 NAIA football season

Notes

References